Montagu House in Whitehall, Westminster, London, England, was the town house built by John Montagu, 2nd Duke of Montagu (1690–1749), whose country seat was  Boughton House in Northamptonshire.

History
In 1731, John Montagu, 2nd Duke of Montagu, abandoned the existing grand Montagu House in the socially declining district of Bloomsbury, which was later to become the premises of the British Museum, and purchased a site that had once been occupied by the Archbishops of York's London residence and had later been part of the site of Whitehall Palace. He built himself a relatively modest mansion in the conventional style of the day, which can be seen in Canaletto's painting of Whitehall.

In the late 1850s, the 2nd Duke of Montagu's descendant, Walter Montagu Douglas Scott, 5th Duke of Buccleuch, one of the United Kingdom's three or four richest landowners, replaced the Georgian house with one of the grandest private mansions in London. It was designed by the versatile Scottish architect William Burn in the style of a French Renaissance chateau. The building was admired in its day. It was built of Portland stone, with a steep mansard roof, corner towers and a skyline peppered with stone chimneys. The interior featured a top-lit central saloon and a grand staircase, heavily coffered ceilings and elaborately carved furnishings. It housed part of the exceptional Buccleuch art collection, including works by Rubens and Rembrandt and the finest British collection of miniatures apart from the Royal Collection. Princess Alice, Duchess of Gloucester, was born there in 1901.

In 1917 the house was taken over for use as government offices, and in 1949–50 it was demolished. The site forms roughly the southern half of that of the current main Ministry of Defence building in Whitehall.

See also
 Montagu House, Bloomsbury
 Montagu House, Portman Square
 Montagu House, Blackheath
 List of demolished buildings and structures in London
 Noble Households – book with Montagu House, Whitehall, inventory of 1746

References

Further reading
 Murdoch, Tessa (ed.), Noble Households: Eighteenth-Century Inventories of Great English Houses. A Tribute to John Cornforth. Cambridge: John Adamson, 2006, pp. 85–116  
 Pearce, David, London's Mansions: The Palatial Houses of the Nobility. London: B. T. Batsford, 2001, originally published in 1986

External links
Montagu House at the Survey of London online.
Plans of the ground and principal floors

Former houses in the City of Westminster
Houses completed in the 19th century
Buildings and structures demolished in 1950